Stanisław Ferdynant Rzewuski (1737–1786) was a Polish noble (szlachcic). Knight of the Order of the White Eagle, awarded on 1760.

Born and raised in Marshal, he was the son of Hetman Wacław Rzewuski and Anna Lubomirska. He married the daughter of Hetman and  Court Marshals  Michał Kazimierz "Rybeńko" Radziwiłł, Katarzyna Karolina Radziwiłł on 13 June 1758 in Nieśwież. They had six children together: Seweryn Rzewuski, Adam Wawrzyniec Rzewuski, Teofilia Rzewuska, Anna Rzewuska, Franciszka Rzewuska and Karolina Rzewuska.

He was Rotmistrz Pancerny since 1755, Great Podstoli of Lithuania since 1759, Great Chorąży of Lithuania from 1762 to 1782, starost of Chełm and Field Marshal of Austria.

Field marshals of Austria
Generals of the Polish–Lithuanian Commonwealth
1737 births
1786 deaths
People from Lviv Oblast
Rzewuski, Stanislaw Ferdynant
Stanislaw Ferdynant
18th-century Polish–Lithuanian military personnel